Linet Chepkorir Toto is a Kenyan politician under the UDA party. After the general election on 9 August 2022, Chepkorir, better known as Toto, is presumed to be the youngest woman to be elected to the National Assembly, currently the Woman Representative in Bomet County.

Early life 

Linet Chepkorir populary known as Toto is the third born child to Leonard Lang’at and Betty Lang’at in Chemomul, Bomet County. She went to  Kapsimbiri Elementary School, where she sat for her KCPE and later on joined Kapsimbiri Secondary School before transferring to Siwot Secondary for her secondary education. She graduated from Tharaka University in April 2021.

Political career 
Linet was elected woman representative in the National Assembly for Bomet County in the 2022 general election. She won 242,775 votes. She is presumed to be the youngest member of the 13th Parliament of Kenya.

See also 
 13th Parliament of Kenya

References 

Living people
People from Bomet County
Kenyan women representatives
21st-century Kenyan women politicians
21st-century Kenyan politicians
Members of the 13th Parliament of Kenya
United Democratic Alliance (Kenya) politicians
Year of birth missing (living people)